The 2000 Liga Perdana 1 season is the third season of Liga Perdana 1. A total of 12 teams participated in the season.

Selangor, Johor and Perlis was promoted from Liga Perdana 2 to increase the total number of teams competing in the league from ten to 12 teams.

The season kicked off on April 15, 2000. Selangor dominated the season and ended up winning the title.

Teams
12 teams competing in the third season of Liga Perdana 1. Perlis and Johor were promoted while Kedah was relegated to Liga Perdana 2.

 Selangor (2000 Liga Perdana 1 champions)
 Penang
 Perak
 Terengganu
 Sarawak
 Negeri Sembilan
 Pahang
 Kuala Lumpur
 Perlis
 Johor
 Sabah (Relegated to Liga Perdana 2)
 Brunei (Relegated to Liga Perdana 2)

League table

Champions

References

Liga Perdana 1 seasons
1
Malaysia